Memo is the debut extended play by Australian singer and songwriter Grace. It released on 26 May 2015 through RCA.

Critical reception
Meggie Morris from Renowned for Sound said "Citing her biggest influences as soul legends Minnie Riperton and Gladys Knight, as well as modern-day sirens Lauryn Hill and Amy Winehouse, it's no surprise that Grace's own musical vision centres on a soulful sound and dynamic, raw vocals that navigate a space between retro charm and contemporary relevance."

Track listing

Charts

Release history

References

2015 debut EPs
RCA Records EPs
EPs by Australian artists